A Lawless Street is a 1955 American Western film directed by Joseph H. Lewis and starring Randolph Scott and Angela Lansbury. The film is also known as The Marshal of Medicine Bend in the United States.

Plot
The marshal of Medicine Bend, Calem Ware (Randolph Scott), tries to keep peace in a lawless town while trying to prevent himself from being killed. The arrival of a show troupe re-unites the marshal with someone from his past, leading to a showdown with his would-be killers and his old flame, Tally Dickinson (Angela Lansbury).

A secret conspiracy to oust the marshall exists between saloon owner Cody Clark (John Emery) and Hamer Thorne (Warner Anderson), owner of the music hall where Tally is appearing. Thorne fancies himself a ladies' man and is playing several women at once—Tally and Cora Dean (Jean Parker), the lonely, middle-aged wife of a wealthy rancher Asaph Dean (James Bell) who is a Ware ally.

Marshall Ware gets into a brutal fistfight with Dooley (Don Megowan), the brother of a man the Marshall killed in self-defense, Dooley is impressed enough by the beating he took that he also becomes the Marshall's ally.

Clark and Thorne finally resort to bringing in a hired gun, Harley Baskam (Michael Pate) to kill Ware. Ware loses a gunfight to Baskam, but he is only unconscious from a bullet that creased his head. Ware's friends keep him concealed in the town jail until he is recovered enough to fight back.

The town goes through a brief period of lawlessness, but Cora discovers Thorne's true nature and offers to turn state's evidence. When Ware is recovered, he makes quick work of Baskam in a second showdown.

Thorne accidentally kills Clark when he hears a doorknob rattle and assumes Ware is on the other side of the door. A posse catches up with Thorne.

With the town cleaned up for good, Ware resigns as sheriff and leaves town to renew his relationship with Tally, who now understands better about Ware's devotion to duty.

Cast
Randolph Scott as Marshal Calem Ware  
Angela Lansbury as Tally Dickinson
Warner Anderson as Hamer Thorne
Jean Parker as Cora Dean
Wallace Ford as Dr. Amos Wynn
John Emery as Cody Clark
James Bell as Asaph Dean
Ruth Donnelly as Molly Higgins
Harry Antrim as Mayor Kent
Michael Pate as Harley Baskam
Don Megowan as Dooley

See also
List of American films of 1955

References

External links

1955 films
Columbia Pictures films
American Western (genre) films
1955 Western (genre) films
Films directed by Joseph H. Lewis
Films scored by Paul Sawtell
1950s English-language films
1950s American films